The Brewers Investment Corporation Ltd was active in the Midlands during the late 19th century.  Its registered offices were at Nos.3-4, County Chambers, Corporation Street, Birmingham.

The company's projects included the purchase and refurbishment of the Adam & Eve in 1889.

The Brewers Investment Corporation had become a public company by 1895 and was listed on the London Stock Exchange for that year.

References

Breweries in England
Defunct companies based in Birmingham, West Midlands
Defunct breweries of the United Kingdom
Defunct companies of the United Kingdom
Companies formerly listed on the London Stock Exchange